Calumma tjiasmantoi is a species of chameleon found in Madagascar.

References

Calumma
Reptiles of Madagascar
Reptiles described in 2020
Taxa named by Mark D. Scherz
Taxa named by Miguel Vences
Taxa named by Frank Glaw